Sandesh is a village and corresponding community development block in Bhojpur district of Bihar, India. As of 2011, its population was 6,874, in 1,037 households. The total block population was 109,712, in 17,011 households.

Demographics 
Sandesh is a rural block with no large urban centres. In 2011, its sex ratio was 912 females to every 1000 males, which was higher than the Bhojpur district average of 907. The sex ratio was slightly higher in the 0-6 age group, with a ratio of 914, which was below the district ratio of 918. Members of scheduled castes made up 14.98% of block residents (compared with the district-wide 15.59%) and members of scheduled tribes made up 0.04% (district-wide 0.51%). The block's literacy rate was 66.73%, which was lower than the district-wide 70.47%. There was a 28.64% gender literacy gap in the block, with 80.39% of men but only 51.75% of women able to read and write (the district-wide gap was 23.71%).

Most of Sandesh block's workforce was employed in agriculture in 2011, with 21.55% of workers being cultivators who owned or leased their own land and another 53.26% being agricultural labourers who worked someone else's land for wages. 5.78% were household industry workers, and the remaining 19.41% were other workers. Most workers in the block were men: 25,844 were male and 8,944 were female.

Villages
Sandesh block contains the following 54 villages, ordered by population:

References 

Villages in Bhojpur district, India